Všeradice is a municipality and village in Beroun District in the Central Bohemian Region of the Czech Republic. It has about 500 inhabitants.

Notable people
Magdalena Dobromila Rettigová (1785–1845), writer

Twin towns – sister cities

Všeradice is twinned with:
 Gârnic, Romania

References

Villages in the Beroun District